Garuda F.C. PH is an association football club in the Philippines formed in 2011.

History
Early in the year 2011, around 21 Indonesian students gathered to play football at the St. Augustine College football field. The students made a commitment for the team to meet and play at St. Augustine every Sunday.

The founder members composed of Jerferson Supit, Frenky Sitorus, Frendy Pangalila, Learyf Karamoy, Jason Nathaniel, Arya Luntungan, Bun Dundu, John Nicolaas II, Nicko, Andrews Warawory, Chanfrien Simbiak, Frederick Maker Andre, Joshua Sihite.

On the gathering of the team on 13 March 2011, they met with one of the event organizers of the World Cup Philippines to play as an Indonesian side.
The team won its 11 aside matches, but lost in the 7 aside matches. They placed 3rd runner up in its debut tournament.

After the tournament, other foreigners and some locals (Cambodians, Chinese, Korean and Filipinos) joined the team. The team adopted the name Garuda F.C.

The Indonesian Students Association in the Philippines (PPIF) began supporting Garuda F.C. PH and the team was made official on 19 June 2011.

The team participated at the 2011 UFL Cup.

Etymology
The name of the team was derived the mythical creature, Garuda which has significance in both Buddhism and Hinduism. In Buddhism, Garuda symbolizes strength and is a knowledgeable creature. In Hindu, Garuda is known as "Taraswin, the fast one" and also "Kāmāyus, the one who lives in happiness". It has a motto as well, being "Para garuda terbang bersama dan menjunjung tinggi arti dari Bhinneka Tunggal Ika" (English: "Garudas fly together and embrace the meaning of Bhinneka Tunggal Ika).

Current squad

(captain)

References

External links
 

Football clubs in the Philippines
2011 establishments in the Philippines
Sports teams in Metro Manila